Kevin Wade (born March 9, 1954) is an American screenwriter and television producer.

Early life and career
Wade was born in Chappaqua, New York, and attended Connecticut College. Before his writing career took off, Wade acted in two films for Mark Rappaport, including The Scenic Route (1978). He wrote the play Key Exchange, which was produced off-Broadway in 1981 and released as a film in 1985. Seven years later he received his first screen credit for Working Girl, which earned him nominations for the Golden Globe Award for Best Screenplay and the Writers Guild of America Award for Best Original Screenplay. Additional film credits include True Colors, Mr. Baseball, Junior, Meet Joe Black, and Maid in Manhattan.

For television, Wade created and executive produced the short-lived ABC drama series Cashmere Mafia. He also wrote the seven episodes that were broadcast by the network before the show was canceled. He joined the writing staff of the CBS drama Blue Bloods in its first season and has served as its executive producer/showrunner since the second season. In 2019 he was nominated for a Mystery  Writers of America Edgar award for the episode “My Aim is True”.

Personal life
He was married to Polly Draper from 1983 to 1990. He has been married to Sasha Clifton since 1991 and has two children.

References

External links

Living people
American male screenwriters
American television writers
Television producers from New York (state)
Connecticut College alumni
1954 births
People from Chappaqua, New York
American male television writers
Screenwriters from New York (state)
Draper family